Eugenio Duse (1889–1969) was an Italian stage and film actor who appeared in thirty one films during his career. He was a relative of the celebrated stage actress Eleonora Duse.

Selected filmography
 Your Money or Your Life (1932)
 Loyalty of Love (1934)
 The Joker King (1935)
 Golden Arrow (1935)
 La Damigella di Bard (1936)
 Giuseppe Verdi (1938)
 It Always Ends That Way (1939)
 The First Woman Who Passes (1940)
 The Hero of Venice (1941)
 The Adulteress (1946)
 The Opium Den (1947)

References

External links

Bibliography
 Hochkofler, Matilde. Anna Magnani. Gremese Editore, 2001.

1889 births
1969 deaths
Italian male stage actors
Italian male film actors
People from Senigallia
20th-century Italian male actors